Rerik (formerly Alt-Gaarz)  is a town in the Rostock district, in Mecklenburg-Western Pomerania, Germany. It is situated on the Baltic Sea coast, 19 km west of Bad Doberan, and 27 km northeast of Wismar. In 1938, Rerik was named after the old Slavic-Scandinavian settlement Reric, that was believed to have been situated near present Rerik.

It is the setting for Alfred Andersch's debut novel, Sansibar oder der letzte Grund (1957).

Rerik West
Rerik West, on a peninsula separated from the town itself by a small isthmus, was a barracks town for Soviet forces during the time of the German Democratic Republic. Following German reunification, it was abandoned in 1992 and declared a restricted area due to contamination by unexploded munitions. It is now a ghost town, and has become a haven for wildlife.

Sons and daughters of the town

 Wolfgang Hillebrandt (born 1944), astrophysicist

External links

Commons category:Rerik-West

References

Seaside resorts in Germany
Cities and towns in Mecklenburg
Populated places established in 1938
Populated coastal places in Germany (Baltic Sea)